The Michigan ballot proposals in 2012 included a referendum on a law passed by the Michigan Legislature and five proposed amendments to the Michigan Constitution. All six proposals were defeated.

Proposal 1
Proposal 1 was a referendum on Public Act 4 of 2011, the emergency manager law, and it resulted in the law's repeal.

P.A. 4 of 2011 was passed by the Michigan Legislature in March 2011 and was signed by Governor Rick Snyder on March 16. It established criteria to assess the financial condition of local government units, including school districts, authorized the Governor to appoint an emergency manager (EM) upon state finding of a financial emergency, and allow the EM to act in place of local government officials, required the EM to develop financial and operating plans, which may include modification or termination of contracts, reorganization of government, and determination of expenditures, services, and use of assets until the emergency is resolved, or, alternatively, authorized a state-appointed review team to enter into a local government approved
consent decree.

Proposal 2
Proposal 2 was a proposed constitutional amendment which would have granted public and private employees the constitutional right to organize and bargain collectively through labor unions, invalidated existing or future state or local laws that limited the ability to join unions and bargain collectively, and to negotiate and enforce collective bargaining agreements, including employees’ financial support of their labor unions, overridden state laws that regulate hours and conditions of employment to the extent that those laws conflict with collective bargaining agreements, and defined "employer" as a person or entity employing one or more employees. Laws may still have been enacted to prohibit public employees from striking. The proposal failed 57%-43%.

Proposal 3
Proposal 3 was a proposed constitutional amendment which would have required electric utilities to provide at least 25% of their annual retail sales of electricity from renewable energy sources, which are wind, solar, biomass, and hydropower, by 2025, limited to not more than 1% per year electric utility rate increases charged to consumers only to achieve compliance with the renewable energy standard, allowed annual extensions of the deadline to meet the 25% standard in order to prevent rate increases over the 1% limit, and required the Legislature to enact additional laws to encourage the use of Michigan made equipment and employment of Michigan residents.

Proposal 4
Proposal 4 was a proposed constitutional amendment which would have allowed in-home care workers to bargain collectively with the Michigan Quality Home Care Council (MQHCC), continued the current exclusive representative of in-home care workers until modified in accordance with labor laws, require MQHCC to provide training for in-home care workers, create a registry of workers who pass background checks, and provide financial services to patients to manage the cost of in-home care, preserved patients' rights to hire in-home care workers who are not referred from the MQHCC registry who are bargaining unit members, and authorized the MQHCC to set minimum compensation standards and terms and conditions of
employment.

Proposal 5
Proposal 5 was a proposed constitutional amendment which would have required a 2/3 majority vote of the State House and the State Senate, or a statewide vote of the people at a November election, in order for the State of Michigan to impose new or additional taxes on taxpayers or expand the base of taxation or increasing the rate of taxation. This section was in no way to be construed to limit or modify tax limitations otherwise created in the Constitution.

Proposal 6
Proposal 6 was a proposed constitutional amendment which would have required the approval of a majority of voters at a statewide election and in each municipality where "new international bridges or tunnels for motor vehicles" are to be located before the State of Michigan may expend state funds or resources for acquiring land, designing, soliciting bids for, constructing, financing, or promoting new international bridges or tunnels, and created a definition of "new international bridges or tunnels for motor vehicles" that means, "any
bridge or tunnel which is not open to the public and serving traffic as of January 1, 2012."

References

Michigan ballot proposals
ballot proposals
Michigan